The 1952 Isle of Man Tourist Trophy was the start of Bob McIntyre's association with the Isle of Man, when he came second in the Junior Clubman TT that year. Irishman Reg Armstrong won his first Senior TT event as well as coming in second in the Junior TT race on a Norton. Armstrong, as a Norton works rider, was back-up to Geoff Duke who came first in the Junior race.

Senior TT (500 cc) classification

Junior TT (350 cc) classification

Lightweight TT (250 cc) classification

Ultra-Lightweight TT (125 cc) classification

Non-championship races

Clubmans Senior TT classification

Clubmans Junior TT classification

Sources

External links
1952 Isle of Man TT race results

Isle of Man Tt
Tourist Trophy
Isle of Man TT
Isle of Man TT